The following is a list of lighthouses in four of the major territories of the United States. Most of the lights listed here have been modernized to be automated beacons on small steel towers or posts. There are just two known surviving lighthouses that held keepers, both of which are now inactive. Information for any given lighthouse may also be incomplete due to a lack of records and/or unreliable information.

Note: Listed separate are lighthouses in Puerto Rico as more information is available about them.

Lighthouses

See also
 Lists of lighthouses
 Lists of lightvessels

Notes
A. While the first build date is unknown, the light appeared on a 1922 list which describes it as a  white square pyramidal tower.
B. While the first build date is unknown, the light appeared on a 1922 list which describes it as a  white square pyramidal tower.
C. The focal height shown here is for the modern structure put into place (steel tower or post).
D. A modern light was mounted on a  skeleton tower next to the house.

References

External links

 

 
United States Coast Guard